Homalium is a genus of plants in the family Salicaceae.

Species

Species include:

 Homalium acuminatum 
 Homalium betulifolium 
 Homalium brevidens 
 Homalium buxifolium 
 Homalium ceylanicum 
 Homalium cochinchinense 
 Homalium dalzielii 
 Homalium dasyanthum 
 Homalium foetidum 
 Homalium gracilipes 
 Homalium henriquesii 
 Homalium hypolasium 
 Homalium jainii 
 Homalium juxtapositum 
 Homalium kunstleri 
 Homalium longifolium 
 Homalium mathieuanum 
 Homalium moto 
 Homalium mouo 
 Homalium nepalense 
 Homalium ogoouense 
 Homalium pallidum 
 Homalium paniculatum 
 Homalium patoklaense 
 Homalium polystachyum 
 Homalium rubiginosum 
 Homalium rubrocostatum 
 Homalium rufescens 
 Homalium sleumerianum 
 Homalium smythei 
 Homalium spathulatum 
 Homalium taypau 
Homalium tomentosum 
 Homalium travancoricum 
 Homalium undulatum

References

 
Salicaceae genera
Taxa named by Nikolaus Joseph von Jacquin
Taxonomy articles created by Polbot